Tagin (Tagen), also known as West Dafla and Bangni (incl. Na) is a Sino-Tibetan language spoken in India.

Stuart Blackburn states that the 350 speakers of Mra have "always been, wrongly, subsumed under the administrative label of Tagin." It is not clear whether Mra is therefore a distinct dialect of Bangni-Tagin, or a different Tani language altogether.

References

Languages of Assam
Tani languages
Languages of Arunachal Pradesh